Reine Clémence Edzoumou Ntsagha (born 1 February 1996), known as Reine Edzoumou and Darcy Edzoumou, is a Gabonese footballer who plays as a forward for Turkish Women's Football Super League club Adana İdman Yurdu and the Gabon women's national team.

Club career 
Edzoumou has played for Missile FC in Gabon and for Adana İdman Yurdu in Turkey.

International career 
Edzoumou capped for Gabon at senior level during the 2020 CAF Women's Olympic Qualifying Tournament.

References

External links 

1996 births
Living people
People from Moanda
Gabonese women's footballers
Women's association football forwards
Missile FC players
Adana İdmanyurduspor players
Turkish Women's Football Super League players
Gabon women's international footballers
Gabonese expatriate footballers
Gabonese expatriate sportspeople in Turkey
Expatriate women's footballers in Turkey